Global Day of Action is a direct action protest format. Environmentalism initiatives began to use it in 2005 in connection with Global Climate Campaign. They aimed to focus world attention on the anthropogenic effect that humans are having on global warming. Its main objective is to spearhead demands that elected representatives of their respective governments honor commitments set forth by the Kyoto Protocol, by conducting in unison peaceful demonstrations around the world. The demonstration, or rallies, are intended to coincide with the United Nations Framework Convention on Climate Change (UNFCCC), a meeting of world leaders from 189 nations, that meet annually to discuss climate change.

History

2018
In 2018, Global Day of Action took place during Global Goals Week, an annual week-long event in September for action, awareness, and accountability for the Sustainable Development Goals.

2007 

The most recent Global Day of Action event, entitled Kyoto Now!, occurred on December 8, 2007 to coincide with the UNFCCC's conference, otherwise known as COP 13/MOP 3, convening Dec 3-14, 2007 in  Bali, Indonesia. Numerous groups and coalitions, as well as independent grassroots efforts, were organized in over eighty countries worldwide to march in open rallies in support of this initiative. Chief among them was Campaign against Climate Change, Stop Climate Chaos and Greenpeace.

There were citizens in 84 countries - fifty more than the first year - participating in simultaneous rallies and marches around the world. Industrialized, G8 nations like Australia, Canada, France, Germany, Japan, Russia, UK, and USA had multiple rallies - 36 in Canada alone -  being planned in cities nationwide.

In Athens, a Saturday demonstration featured music, juggling and stilt-walking acts, with traffic being interrupted around Syntagma Square by the 102 organizations taking part. In Taiwan, about 1,500 people marched through the streets holding banners and placards saying "No to carbon dioxide". Toronto activists also congested its main thoroughfare of Yonge Street, with an estimated 2000-3000 marchers, although another report estimated 500. Speaking at that event under a sunny sky, which began at Dundas Square, was NDP federal party leader Jack Layton, and an impassioned and well received speech, in both French and English, by 12-year-old Misha Hamu. Elsewhere in Canada, a mock funeral was conducted in Edmonton, where black-clad protesters sang songs and gave eulogies over a long black coffin, and David Suzuki spoke at a rally in Vancouver.

In Bangalore, more than 1000 volunteers of Greenpeace descended on M. Chinnaswamy Stadium, dressed head to toe in yellow, holding up a large number of placards with climate messages, making human art formations and wearing fun masks. Greenpeace Southeast Asia, Thailand celebrated their event by releasing their new edition of Save the Climate Handbook at Chatuchak weekend market, which also featured a demonstration clinic on solar energy. In Istanbul there was over 7000 participants rallying under a clear blue sky.

In Berlin, German ice sculpture artist Christian Funk, carved a polar bear out of 15 tons of ice in front of the Brandenburg Gate on December 7, 2007, in honor of the protest. Measuring 4m x 4m x 1.5m, it was on display all the following day as it slowly melted. In London over 10,000 supporters turned out in the rain carrying placards denouncing a planned expansion at Heathrow Airport of a third runway.

Locations of demonstrations in 2007

Albania
Andorra
Argentina
Australia
Austria
Bangladesh
Belarus
Belgium
Benin
Bermuda
Bolivia
Brazil
Bulgaria
Burundi
Cameroon
Canada
Colombia
Congo (DR)
Costa Rica
Croatia
Czech Republic
Denmark
Egypt
Finland
France
Germany
Ghana
Greece
Guinea
Iceland
India
Indonesia
Ireland
Italy
Japan
Jordan
Kenya
Lebanon
Liberia
Macedonia
Malta
Mexico
Morocco
Nepal
Netherlands
New Caledonia
New Zealand
Nicaragua
Nigeria
Northern Ireland
Norway
Pakistan
Palestine
Panama
Paraguay
Philippines
Poland
Portugal
Puerto Rico
Romania
Russia
Scotland
Senegal
Serbia
Sierra Leone
Singapore
Slovenia
South Africa
South Korea
Spain
Sri Lanka
Sweden
Switzerland
Taiwan
Tanzania
Thailand
Togo
Turkey
Uganda
Ukraine
United Arab Emirates
United Kingdom
United States
Uruguay

2005
In response to entering into force of the Kyoto Protocol, following ratification by Russia, on February 16, 2005, Global Day of Action rallies were first conducted on December 3, 2005 to coincide with the UNFCCC's First Meeting of Parties to the Kyoto Protocol, or MOP 1, in Montreal, Quebec, Canada. The following year on November 3 and 11, 2006, rallies were conducted again  when the UNFCCC convened for the Second Meeting of Parties, or MOP 2, in Nairobi, Kenya.

Locations of demonstrations in 2005

 Sydney (Australia)
 Bangladesh
 Brazil
 Sofia (Bulgaria)
 Halifax (Canada) - organized by Zoë Caron, Co-author of Climate Change for Dummies, and Aliza Weller, Ecology Action Centre
 Montreal (Canada)
 Chile
 Congo (Democratic Republic of)
 Zagreb (Croatia)
 Helsinki (Finland)
 Paris (France)
 Berlin (Germany)
 Athens (Greece)
 Dublin (Ireland)
 Indonesia
 Italy
 Japan
 Mexico
 Wellington (New Zealand)
 Nicaragua
 Oslo (Norway)
 Peru
 Manila (Philippines)
 Lisbon (Portugal)
 Romania
 Moscow (Russia)
 South Africa
 Barcelona (Spain)
 Istanbul (Turkey)
 Uganda 
 London (England)
 Edinburgh (Scotland)
 Belfast (Northern Ireland)
 United States
 Venezuela

See also 
 Campaign against Climate Change
 An Inconvenient Truth
 Climate change
 Earth Day
 International Day of Climate Action
 Individual and political action on climate change
 World Environment Day

Notes and references

External links
Global Climate Campaign
Campaign against Climate Change
Stop Climate Chaos - Scotland
Stop Climate Chaos

Environmental awareness days
Activism